Jan Kolář (born 22 November 1986) is a Czech professional ice hockey defenseman for HC Dynamo Pardubice in the Czech Extraliga (ELH) and the Czech national team.

Kolář previously played in the Kontinental Hockey League for HC Donbass, Admiral Vladivostok and Amur Khabarovsk. He participated at the IIHF World Championship for the Czech Republic in 2014, 2015 2016 and 2019. He also played in the 2018 Winter Olympics.

Career statistics

Regular season and playoffs

International

References

External links
 

1986 births
Living people
Admiral Vladivostok players
Amur Khabarovsk players
Czech ice hockey defencemen
HC Donbass players
HC Dynamo Pardubice players
BK Havlíčkův Brod players
KLH Vajgar Jindřichův Hradec players
Ice hockey players at the 2018 Winter Olympics
Olympic ice hockey players of the Czech Republic
Stadion Hradec Králové players
Sportspeople from Pardubice
Czech expatriate sportspeople in Ukraine
Expatriate ice hockey players in Ukraine
Czech expatriate ice hockey players in Russia